4-Fluorobromobenzene is a halogenated aromatic organic compound with the formula C6H4BrF. It is a derivative of benzene, with a bromine atom bonded para to a fluorine atom. It has uses as a precursor to some pharmaceuticals, as an agrochemical intermediate, and in organic synthesis. It is a colorless liquid of low acute toxicity.

Production and uses
4-Fluorobromobenzene is synthesized via bromination of fluorobenzene in the presence of a Lewis acid catalyst such as iron(III) bromide or aluminium tribromide.

4-Bromofluorobenzene is regarded by the Toxic Substances Control Act as a high production volume chemical, that is, a chemical that 1 million pounds (about 500 tonnes) per year is either produced in or imported to the United States. As of 2002, companies producing or importing this compound reported 10 million (4,536,000 kilograms) used. This is up from 500,000 pounds (226,800 kilograms) used in 1986, as reported in the Inventory Update Rule of the Toxic Substances Control Act.

4-Bromofluorobenzene forms a Grignard reagent used in the synthesis of 4-fluorophenyl containing compounds, such as the pesticides Flusilazole.

Safety
This compound is a flammable liquid. It has a flash point of 53 °C.

References

Bromoarenes
Fluoroarenes